The Acropolis International Tournament 1986 was the first edition of the Acropolis International Basketball Tournament. It was held from June 18 to June 20, 1986, at the SEF arena in Piraeus, Athens, Greece. The competition is played under FIBA rules as a round-robin tournament. The participating teams were the hosts, Greece, as well as Italy, Yugoslavia, and the Netherlands.

The tournament featured famous international basketball players such as Dražen Petrović, Fanis Christodoulou, Nikos Galis, Antonello Riva, Vlade Divac, Rik Smits, Walter Magnifico, Stojko Vranković, Pierluigi Marzorati, and Panagiotis Giannakis.

Participating teams

Standings 

|-bgcolor="gold"

|}

Results

Final standings

Statistics 
First Day:

Greece - Yugoslavia 87-95 (45-49)

GREECE: Galis 40 (1), Stavropoulos, Kambouris 3, Filippou 10, F. Christodoulou 15 (1), Karatzas 7, Pedoulakis 2, A. Christodoulou, Andritsos, Romanidis 6, C. Christodoulou 4.

YUGOSLAVIA: D. Petrović 12 (2), Čutura 12, Cvjetičanin 31 (3), A. Petrović 15 (4), Vranković 10, Radovanović 17, Mutapčić 1, Radović 7, Petranović. 

Italy - Holland 90-63 (39-34)

ITALY: Magnifico 9, Costa 10, Polesello 7, Brunamonti 15, Villalta 2, Riva 12 (1), Sacchetti 1, Premier 9 (1), dell'Agnello, Smparo, Gilardi 6, Binelli.

HOLLAND: Schilp 10, de Waard 6, Bottse 2, Esveldt, Smits 21, Ebeltjes 4, van Dinten 13, Heijdeman 7, Griekspoor, Broukman. 

2nd Day:

Greece - Italy 91-93 (38-46)

GREECE: Galis 22, Giannakis 23 (5), Karatzas 6, Filippou 8, F. Christodoulou 9 (1), Kambouris 12, Romanidis 7 (1), A. Christodoulou, Pedoulakis, Andritsos 2, Stavropoulos 2, Melissinos.

ITALY: Riva 15 (2), dell'Agnello, Villalta 18, Gilardi 6, Sacchetti 10, Brunamonti 5, Polesello 8, Magnifico 11, Ritsi 2, Marzorati 10, Premier 6. 

Yugoslavia - Holland 105-76 (59-41)

YUGOSLAVIA: D. Petrović 42 (4), Divac 6, Petranović 6, Mutapčić 7 (1), A. Petrović 13 (3), Radović 1, Vranković 2, Arapović 4, Radovanović 12, Čutura 8, Cvjetičanin 4.

HOLLAND: Schilp 11 (1), Bottse 15 (1), Esveldt 4, Smits 18, Ebeltjes 2, Emanoyels 6 (2), de Waard, van Dinten 8, Egkmont, Heijdeman 8, Griekspoor 4. 

3rd Day:

Greece - Holland 104-88

GREECE: Galis 46 (1), Giannakis 10 (1), Kambouris 4, Melissinos, Stavropoulos 8, F. Christodoulou 10, Andritsos, Filippou 11, Romanidis 2, Pedoulakis 3 (1), Karatzas 8, Dimakopoulos 2.

HOLLAND: Smits 20, Bottse 11, Schilp 17 (1), Ebeltjes 4, Esveldt, Heijdeman 9, van Dinten 19, de Waard, Broukman 6. 

Yugoslavia - Italy 92-80

YUGOSLAVIA: D. Petrović 26 (3), A. Petrović 16 (3), Divac 7, Čutura 17, Petranović 4, Radović 5, Vranković, Radovanović 14, Arapović 3.

ITALY: Magnifico 9, Polesello, Gilardi 2, Brunamonti 9, Villalta 11, Binelli 8, Riva 14 (2), Sacchetti 5, Caste 2, Marzorati 3, Ritsi, Premier 10 (2).

Top Scorers

External links
Basket.gr Acropolis Cup History Search Results 

Acropolis International Basketball Tournament
June 1986 sports events in Europe
1985–86 in European basketball
1986 in Greek sport
1986 in Italian sport
1986 in Dutch sport
1985–86 in Yugoslav basketball